Beynost station (French: Gare de Beynost) is a French railway station located in commune of Beynost, Ain department in the Auvergne-Rhône-Alpes region. It is located at kilometric point (KP) 20.966 on the Lyon-Geneva railway.

As of 2020, the station is owned and operated by the SNCF and served by TER Auvergne-Rhône-Alpes trains.

History 
The Compagnie du chemin de fer de Lyon à Genève opened the station on 23 June 1856, along with a section of railway between Lyon and Ambérieu-en-Bugey, via Miribel.

The station previously consisted of a passenger building, which has since disappeared.

In 2019, the SNCF estimated that 213,302 passengers traveled through the station.

Services

Passenger services 
Classified as a PANG (point d'accès non géré), the station is unstaffed without any passenger services. Howeverm the station is equipped with ticket vending machines.

Train services 
As of 2020, Beynost station is served by TER Auvergne-Rhône-Alpes line 35 trains running between Ambérieu and Lyon-Part-Dieu.

Intermodality

References 

Railway stations in Ain
Railway stations in France opened in 1856
Lyon–Geneva railway